Affari tuoi is an Italian game show based upon the internationally popular game show Deal or No Deal. It aired on Rai 1 from 13 October 2003 to 17 March 2017 in the access prime time range. From 26 December 2020, the program returned to air on Saturday between the access prime time slot and the prime time slot. It is broadcast on public broadcaster Rai 1, and it is also shown regularly on RAI International, RAI's international television service.

The show was hosted in chronological order include: Paolo Bonolis (October 2003 – May 2005), Pupo (September 2005 – March 2006), Antonella Clerici (March – June 2006), Flavio Insinna (September 2006 – June 2008), Max Giusti (September 2008 – June 2013) and again Flavio Insinna (September 2013 - 17 March 2017). The re-edition of 2020 sees the conduct of Carlo Conti, who had already conducted the episode of 1 April 2015, exchanging the management of L'eredità, a program that he presented at that time, with Flavio Insinna, to make an "April fool" to viewers; a new edition aired in 2022 and was hosted by the Italian presenter Amadeus.

Gameplay 

In this Italian version, there are 20 boxes; each person holding a box lives in and represents of one of the twenty regions of Italy.

The highest prize is €500,000, but on some occasions there is a special €1,000,000 prize. In addition to small money prizes, like €0.50, there are three gag prizes—usually items like salami, a year's supply of soap, or stuffed animals like hippos and weasels (from seasons 2006 to 2007, a hippo prize took place instead of the €500 one).

The box named Pacco X, and also a Pacco Y between September 2008 and June 2013 (both meaning "mystery package"), may contain values between €0.02 and €200,000 (see below).

The box named Pacco Matto (crazy box, February 2011 – June 2013) or La Matta (the madwoman, from September 2013 onwards) may contain one of the possibilities that may affect the progress of the game, positively or negatively, including doubling the top prize to €1,000,000, or forcing the player to leave the game (see below).

The manager is known as "Il Dottore" (the doctor) and knows the content of the boxes. Therefore, sometimes his offers can give hints as to whether the contestant's box contains a high amount of money.

In order to give himself further chances, the manager sometimes decides to play "Di pacco in pacco" ("step by step") when high prizes are still active.

In Affari tuoi, to refuse an offer, instead of saying "No Deal!", a contestant says, "Rifiuto l'offerta e vado avanti", meaning "I refuse the offer and go on". To accept, a contestant says "Accetto l'offerta", meaning, "I'll take the offer." Unlike the US version of the show, there is no button to push. (In fact, international versions of Deal do not use a button and cover.)

Comparison with other versions 

 The Spanish version of "Deal or no Deal", ¡Allá tú!, aired by Mediaset's Telecinco is exactly the same format as the Italian version, except that the boxes represent 20 of the 50 provinces of Spain.
 The British version uses boxes like the Italian one. The syndicated US version uses 22 like the British version, but uses briefcases like the primetime NBC version, and is somewhat different in format.
 The French version, À prendre ou à laisser, is different in format, but uses a "box for each region" concept.

Top prize winners 

The first winner of €1 million occurred on April 7, 2006, when Maria Giulia Tullo from Fossalto won €1,000,000. Just ten days later, Vincenzo de Paola from Campobasso won €500,000. They also received the Tapiro d'Oro (Golden Tapir) from the Canale 5 show Striscia la notizia, due to suspected fraud.

On March 17, 2012, another million euro winning occurred to Gabriele Calvello, thanks to picking Raddoppia which doubles the top prize after opening Pacco Matto. Calvello, whose father died of cancer, decided to donate part of his winnings for cancer research.

In addition, thirteen players won €500,000 in their boxes:

 Roberto Pepi (February 4, 2004)
 Francesca Madeddu (December 16, 2004)
 Clarissa Meneghini (December 19, 2007)
 Danilo Anderlini (September 17, 2008)
 Francesca Cataldo (October 22, 2008)
 Roberto Caterina (November 23, 2008)
 Mara Ancelotti (January 1, 2009)
 Stefania Menegazzo (February 22, 2010)
 Mauro Ghiraldini (November 21, 2012)
 Patrizia Montalbano (January 25, 2013)
 Pierangela Zaccaria (May 29, 2014)
Alberto Bindi (May 17, 2016) 
Alessandro Corona (February 22, 2017)

On March 16, 2013, Cristiana Fraccon from Carugate accepted the offer of €500,000, which is the biggest offer in the show's history, with €50 and the doubled top prize of €1,000,000 remaining. She had the latter in her box.

Controversy
In the Fall of 2006, Codacons, an Italian consumers organisation, pointed out how high prize boxes ("pacchi") seemed to survive up to the end of the game in much more cases than would be statistically expected.

Box values (as of September 2016 to March 2017) 
Note: Some small values will be replaced with joke prizes.

Possible values of Pacco X (as of September 2013 to June 2015) 

Pacco X (and also Pacco Y from September 2008 to June 2013) are unknown content boxes (the mystery packages). At a certain point of the game, the contestant is asked to take one of the ten envelopes (two of twenty until June 2013) contained into a poll and containing a prize from €0.02 to €200,000. Since September 2015 there is no Pacco X content boxes.

The whole box value line
If we combine both of the box value lines and remove "Brivido", we get this:

Brivido 
Previously known as Pacco Matto (crazy box) until June 2013, and La Matta (the madwoman) until June 2014 and Sgambetto (trip) until June 2016. If the player has not sold his/her box yet and there are more than two unopened boxes, once Brivido (shiver) is opened, the player is asked to take one of six cards containing each of the following:
Cambio obbligato (Forced swap): The player is forced to swap his/her box with one of other unopened boxes.
Niente special (Nothing special): Special (see below) is no longer effective when the player reveals 3 "blues" in a row.
Pari o dispari? (Even or odd?): The player has to open either all even- or odd-numbered boxes in play.
Ci pensa lui (He'll take care of it): The player will temporarily leave the place, and was replaced in the choice of the next 3 boxes with the box holder who opened Brivido. If there are any offers within those 3 box picks, the box holder has to decide whether the player should take it.
Cambi con due? (Swap with two?): The player can either keep his/her box, or swap it with two of the other boxes.
Paccologia (Parcelology): A screenshot from a past episode of the show with several remaining amounts is shown, and the player is asked to guess which was won. The doctor reveals one of the boxes containing a "blue" amount if the player guessed correctly.

Brivido has a value of €200 if it is held by the player.

The following were once appeared but were later replaced:
Raddoppia (Double): The biggest unrevealed amount is doubled (except for Pacco X and Pacco Y).
Apri un blu (Open a blue): The doctor tells the player the number of a box containing a "blue" amount (from €0.01 to €250, except for Pacco X and Pacco Y). It is only effective if there are at least two "blue" amounts remaining.
Vedo e prevedo (I see and predict): The player is asked to predict the content of the next box. The player wins an extra €1,000 for correct guess.
Ci penso io (I'll take care of it): The player will temporarily leave the place, and was replaced in the choice of the next 3 boxes with the box holder who opened the scroll. If there are any offers within those 3 box picks, the box holder has to decide whether the player should take it.
Provaci (Try it): The player undergoes a skill test (such as quizzes, riddles, etc.) as requested by the doctor. The player wins an extra €1,000 if the test is passed.
Mangia come parli (Eat what you say): The player tests with a recipe or with the dishes offered in dialect. The player wins an extra €1,000 if the test is passed.
Chiedo l’aumento (I ask for the raise): The box will increase by 10% of its final payout. (That increase does not include prizes or prize with the "Game of the 3 boxes")
Vinci 1.000 euro (Win 1,000 euros): The player additionally wins €1,000.
Vinci subito 5.000€ (Win 5,000 euros now): The player additionally wins €5,000.
Non scegli tu (You don't choose): The player chooses one from 19 other box holders, and the chosen one chooses the next box to open. It is not effective if there are only two unopened boxes after Pacco Matto is opened.
Come non detto (As never said): Nothing happens and the game goes on.
Proposta indecente (Naughty proposal): The doctor makes a "strategic" proposal, for example offers to reveal the content of a box, but halving all prizes.
Scarta (Discard): The player chooses one from other unopened boxes, and it is kept unopened until the doctor (i.e. the banker) decides to open it. It is only effective if there are at least four unopened boxes after Pacco Matto is opened.
Oggettino (Small object): The player wins an additional €50 and a small object prize.
Oggettone (Large object): The player wins an additional €50 and a large object prize.
Svela la X (Reveal the X): The value of Pacco X is revealed.
Conta (Count): The player chooses the next box to open through a counting-out game, which starts from the first unopened box except for the one held by the player.
Vai o resti (Go or stay): The player is asked to choose between going on or quitting the game immediately until the next time he/she is chosen as the player again. This could be useful when the player is in a bad situation such as there are only small amounts remaining.
Arrivederci (Goodbye): The player leaves the game instantly and is replaced by one of the box holders. The new player is chosen by revealing the name of a region hidden in La busta nera (the black envelope).
Pericolo Pubblico (Audience risk): The player chooses one of the audience members and the chosen one chooses the next box to open.
Apri un pacco in più (Open one more box): The player is asked to open one more box before the offer.
Dimezza (Half): The biggest unrevealed amount is halved (except for Pacco X and Pacco Y).
Chiama i vicini (Call the neighbors): The player has to open all boxes held by the holders from the player's region of origin (North, Central or South).
Salvo (Safe): Nothing happens and the game goes on.
Lucchetto (Lock): The player is asked to "lock" one of the remaining boxes and the prize contained in it will no longer be won. This box will be opened by the host only after the player decided whether to accept or reject the offer.

Pacco Natale or Pacco Befana
During Christmas specials, one of the amounts (€50,000 in 2012, €10,000 in 2013 and 2014) is replaced with Pacco Natale (Christmas box) until Christmas Day or Pacco Befana (Befana box) after Christmas until Epiphany (January 6). Once the box is opened, the player chooses one of 10 gift boxes and wins the gift in the chosen box.

Additional games
Gioco dell'indovino (Game of the soothsayer, February – June 2012)
Before opening one of the first six boxes, the player is asked to guess the content of the box. The player wins an extra €5,000 for correct guess.
Gioco del superpacco (Game of the superbox, September 2012 – June 2013)
Before opening one of the first three boxes, the player is asked to guess the content of the box. If the player guesses correctly, the biggest unrevealed amount other than €500,000 becomes €500,000.
Gioco dei 3 Pacchi (Game of 3 boxes, September 2013 – June 2015)
The player wins an extra €5,000 if the box containing Pachito is found within the first three picks.
Che jella sia (What bad luck is, from September 2013 onwards)
The player can decide whether to play the game with 5 to 14 boxes remaining. Each of the "blues" remaining (including Brivido) has a value of €10,000. If the player managed to reveal all "reds" with at least one "blue" unrevealed, the player wins €10,000 for each "blue" unrevealed. Otherwise, the player leaves with nothing.
Special
September 2015 – June 2016: If the player revealed 3 "blues" in a row, the player undergoes a skill test as requested by the doctor. The player wins an extra €3,000 if the test is passed. If the player revealed 3 consecutive "blues" for the second time, the highest amount in play is increased by €100,000. For the third time, the player leaves the game with €10,000. The €3,000 bonus is also withdrawn.
From September 2016 onwards: If the player revealed 3 "blues" in a row, the highest "pink" amount (from €500 to €32,000) in play is doubled. For the second time, the highest amount in play is increased by €100,000. For the third time, the player leaves the game with €10,000.

Trivia 

On February 5, 2007, Flavio Insinna appeared with his models on the US version of Deal or No Deal via satellite, to wish a contestant from Sicily luck. The Sicilian, who appeared on the US show with his extended family, was also an avid viewer of Affari tuoi.

References 

Deal or No Deal
Italian game shows
RAI original programming
Italian comedy television series
2003 Italian television series debuts
2000s Italian television series
2010s Italian television series